Israel and Sudan relations refers to diplomatic ties between Israel and Sudan. In October 2020, the two countries announced that they would establish diplomatic relations. In February 2023 they established diplomatic relations officially.

Until April 20, 2021, Sudan had a law since 1958 that forbid establishing relations with Israel, and outlawed business with citizens of Israel as well as business relationships with Israeli companies or companies with Israeli interests. The law also forbade the direct or indirect import of any Israeli goods.

History
Sudan went to war with Israel in the 1948 Arab–Israeli War and the Six-Day War in 1967, though it did not participate in the Suez Crisis. In the early 1950s, Sudan – then still not independent – had active trade relations with Israel.

Sudan did not actively participate in the Yom Kippur War, as Sudanese forces arrived too late to participate. Israel backed Christian militias that fought the Sudanese government in the First and Second Sudanese Civil Wars.

Normalization

In January 2016, Sudanese Foreign Minister Ibrahim Ghandour floated normalized ties with Israel provided the U.S. government lifted economic sanctions. Sudanese President Omar al-Bashir followed that up by saying in an interview with Saudi newspaper Okaz, "Even if Israel had conquered Syria, it would not have inflicted the destruction taking place there right now, would not have killed the number of people killed so far and would not have expelled people the way they are being expelled now."

Israel flew medics and equipment to Sudan to try to save a diplomat, Najwa Gadah Aldam, who worked as a political adviser to the president of Uganda Yoweri Museveni, when she was infected and later died from COVID-19.

It was revealed in early September 2016 that Israel had contacted the U.S. government and other Western countries and encouraged them to take steps to improve relations with Sudan in the wake of the break in relations between the Arab-African country and Iran in the prior year. Kara later revealed at an event in Beersheba that he was maintaining contacts with many Sudanese officials, and did not deny that a Sudanese official had recently visited Israel. In February 2020, Israeli Prime Minister Benjamin Netanyahu and the Chairman of the Sovereignty Council of Sudan, Abdel Fattah al-Burhan, met in Uganda, where they agreed to normalize the ties between the two countries. Later that month, Israeli planes were allowed to fly over Sudan.

On 22 October 2020, an Israeli delegation visited Sudan, where they met with Abdel Fattah al-Burhan for talks on the normalization of ties between the two countries. On 23 October 2020, Israel and Sudan agreed to a deal to normalize ties. In the meantime, Egyptian president Abdel Fattah el-Sisi welcomed the normalization agreement.

On 2 February 2023, Israeli Minister of Foreign Affairs Eli Cohen visited Khartoum and agreed with Abdel Fattah al-Burhan to sign the normalization of relations in Washington, D.C. in a few months' time.

See also
Foreign relations of Israel
Foreign relations of Sudan
History of the Jews in Sudan

References

 

 
Sudan
Bilateral relations of Sudan
Jewish Sudanese history